Alexander Straub may refer to:

Alexander Straub (athlete) (born 1983), German pole vaulter
Alexander Straub (entrepreneur) (born 1972), German telecommunications businessman